Oectropsis pusillus is a species of beetle in the family Cerambycidae. It was described by Blanchard in 1851.

References

Acanthocinini
Beetles described in 1851